Raphael Kirshbaum Building, also known as the R. Kirshbaum Company, is a historic commercial building located at Union City, Randolph County, Indiana.  It was built in 1876, and is a three-story, rectangular, Italianate style brick building.  It features rounded arch openings with pressed tin hoodmolds and a metal cornice with a wide overhang supported by brackets.

It was added to the National Register of Historic Places in 1990. It is located in the Union City Commercial Historic District.

References

Commercial buildings on the National Register of Historic Places in Indiana
Italianate architecture in Indiana
Commercial buildings completed in 1876
Buildings and structures in Randolph County, Indiana
National Register of Historic Places in Randolph County, Indiana
Historic district contributing properties in Indiana